Kalmer Lain (born 7 June 1968 in Paide) is an Estonian politician. He was the former and mayor of both Jõgeva (2009–2013) and former Tabivere Parish, and a member of the XII Riigikogu representing the Estonian Reform Party.

On November 18, 2014, in connection with the resignation of the mayor of Tartu, Reno Laidre, Lain became a member of the XII Riigikogu.

References

Living people
1968 births
Estonian businesspeople
Estonian Reform Party politicians
Members of the Riigikogu, 2011–2015
Mayors of places in Estonia
University of Tartu alumni
People from Paide